Hopea bullatifolia is a tree in the family Dipterocarpaceae, native to Borneo. The specific epithet bullatifolia means "blistered leaf".

Description
It has buttresses. The bark is smooth.

Distribution and habitat
Hopea bullatifolia is endemic to Borneo. Its habitat is lowland dipterocarp forest.

Conservation
Hopea bullatifolia has been assessed as near threatened on the IUCN Red List. It is threatened by conversion of land for palm oil plantations. In Sarawak, the species is threatened by dam construction. In Kalimantan, it is threatened by logging for its timber. The species occurs mostly outside of protected areas.

References

bullatifolia
Endemic flora of Borneo
Plants described in 1967